This is a list of specialty facilities of fire departments, besides fire stations, and not including fire lookout towers.  Specialty functions include:
supporting separate water systems for firefighting, distinct from the main municipal water systems of cities
fire alarm headquarters

For buildings which include a fire stations as well as some of these functions, see list of fire stations

Notable specialized facilities include:

in the United Kingdom
Defence Fire Training and Development Centre
London Fire Brigade Museum, in former London Fire Brigade headquarters

in the United States
Pumping Station No. 2 San Francisco Fire Department Auxiliary Water Supply System (1912), which supports the separate firefighting water supply system in San Francisco, California
Fire Alarm, Telegraph and Police Signaling Building, Troy, New York
Tulsa Fire Alarm Building, Tulsa, Oklahoma
Fire Alarm Station, Tacoma, Washington
Milwaukee Fire Department High Pressure Pumping Station (1931), in Milwaukee, Wisconsin, which provided high pressure water to fight fires in an industrial area, replacing use of a fireboat
Fire Department Headquarters-Fire Alarm Headquarters, Washington, D.C.

For training, numerous, often included in fire station facilities, but sometimes separate:
Drill tower

See also
Fireboat Station, Tacoma, Washington
List of fire stations
List of firefighting monuments and memorials
List of firefighting museums

Specialty facilities
Government buildings